

293001–293100 

|-bgcolor=#f2f2f2
| colspan=4 align=center | 
|}

293101–293200 

|-id=131
| 293131 Meteora ||  || The Meteora is a UNESCO World Heritage Site and a formation of immense monolithic pillars in central Greece. Hill-like huge rounded boulders dominate the local area and six monasteries are built on the natural conglomerate pillars. || 
|}

293201–293300 

|-bgcolor=#f2f2f2
| colspan=4 align=center | 
|}

293301–293400 

|-id=366
| 293366 Roux ||  || Pierre Paul Émile Roux (1853–1933), a French bacteriologist, close collaborator of Louis Pasteur, and co-founder of the Pasteur Institute || 
|-id=383
| 293383 Maigret ||  || Jules Maigret, also known as "Commissaire Maigret", a fictional character created by writer Georges Simenon in 1931. Maigret is a French police detective and Commissaire a la Brigade Criminelle de Paris. || 
|}

293401–293500 

|-id=477
| 293477 Teotihuacan || 2007 FY || Teotihuacan is an ancient Mesoamerican city located in a sub-valley of the Valley of Mexico. Apart from the pyramids, Teotihuacan is also anthropologically significant for its complex, multi-family residential avenue of the dead; and the small portion of its vibrant murals that have been exceptionally well-preserved. || 
|-id=499
| 293499 Wolinski ||  || Georges Wolinski (1934–2015), a French cartoonist || 
|}

293501–293600 

|-bgcolor=#f2f2f2
| colspan=4 align=center | 
|}

293601–293700 

|-bgcolor=#f2f2f2
| colspan=4 align=center | 
|}

293701–293800 

|-id=707
| 293707 Govoradloanatoly ||  || Anatoliy Vasylyovych Govoradlo (born 1960), a physicist by education, who is also known as a Ukrainian poet and composer. || 
|}

293801–293900 

|-id=809
| 293809 Zugspitze ||  || Zugspitze, located in the Alps, the highest mountain (2962 m) in Germany. || 
|-id=878
| 293878 Tapping ||  || Kenneth Tapping (born 1945), a solar physicist at the NRC-Dominion Radio Astrophysical Observatory. || 
|}

293901–294000 

|-id=909
| 293909 Matterhorn ||  || The Matterhorn (Monte Cervino; Mont Cervin), a remarkably shaped mountain in the Alps on the border between Switzerland and Italy || 
|-id=926
| 293926 Harrystine ||  || G. Harry Stine (1928–1997), one of the founding figures of model rocketry (hobby of spacemodeling) in the 1950s, enjoyed by millions of enthusiasts today. He also founded the National Association of Rocketry. || 
|-id=934
| 293934 MPIA ||  || The Max Planck Institute for Astronomy, abbreviated MPIA, at Heidelberg in Germany || 
|-id=985
| 293985 Franquin ||  || André Franquin (1924–1997), a Belgian comics artist, producer of the Spirou and Fantasio strip, and creator of the characters Gaston Lagaffe and Marsupilami || 
|}

References 

293001-294000